"Don't Press Charges and I Won't Sue" is a science fiction story by Charlie Jane Anders. It was first published in Boston Review, in their 2017 Global Dystopias anthology.

Synopsis

Rachel is a trans woman who is captured by an agency that forces detransition by means of brain transplants — where she discovers that the person supervising her torture is her childhood friend Jeffrey.

Reception

"Don't Press Charges and I Won't Sue" won the 2018 Theodore Sturgeon Memorial Award, and was on the Honor List for the James Tiptree Jr. Award.  Gardner Dozois compared it to Kafka's The Castle.

Publishers Weekly considered it "astoundingly good".

In 2020, Anders stated that she has only read the story aloud once, as she finds it too traumatizing; as well, she reported that "other trans people have told [her] that they had to lie down after reading it."

Origin
Anders has described the story's genesis as her own anxieties over the then-pending inauguration of Donald Trump.

References

External links
Text of the story, at Boston Review

Short stories by Charlie Jane Anders
2017 short stories
Theodore Sturgeon Award-winning works
Transgender literature
2010s LGBT literature
LGBT-related horror literature
LGBT literature in the United States
LGBT speculative fiction
LGBT short stories